Senator Berry may refer to:

Members of the United States Senate
George L. Berry (1882–1948), U.S. Senator from Tennessee from 1937 to 1938
James Henderson Berry (1841–1913), U.S. Senator from Arkansas from 1885 to 1907

United States state senate members
Albert S. Berry (1836–1908), Kentucky State Senate
Cabell R. Berry (1848–1910), Tennessee State Senate
Charles H. Berry (1823–1900), Minnesota State Senate
Ellis Yarnal Berry (1902–1999), South Dakota State Senate
Frederick Berry (1949–2018), Massachusetts State Senate
John M. Berry (1827–1887), Minnesota State Senate
Kenneth F. Berry (1916–2003), Ohio State Senate
Nancy Turbak Berry (born 1956), South Dakota State Senate
Nathaniel S. Berry (1796–1894), New Hampshire State Senate
Orville F. Berry (1852–1921), Illinois State Senate
Red Berry (Texas politician) (1899–1969), Texas State Senate
Richard N. Berry (1915–2018), Maine State Senate
Swift Berry (1887–1967), California State Senate

Others
Lorraine Berry (1949–2010), Senate of the U.S. Virgin Islands